Tine Veenstra (born 20 May 1983, Hoorn) is a Dutch bobsledder who has competed since 2007. Together with Esmé Kamphuis she finished eighth in the two-woman event at the 2010 Winter Olympics in Vancouver.

Veenstra finished eighth in the two-woman event at the FIBT World Championships 2009 in Lake Placid, New York. Her best World Cup finish was eighth in a two-woman event at Park City, Utah in 2009.

References

Vancouver 2010 Profile

1983 births
Living people
Bobsledders at the 2010 Winter Olympics
Dutch female bobsledders
Olympic bobsledders of the Netherlands
People from Hoorn
Sportspeople from North Holland
21st-century Dutch women